Fabio Casas Buitrago (born 13 March 1959) is a Colombian racing cyclist. He rode in the 1983 Tour de France.

References

1959 births
Living people
Colombian male cyclists
Place of birth missing (living people)